Live at Montmartre is a live album by the George Adams-Don Pullen Quartet with guitarist John Scofield recorded in 1985 for the Dutch Timeless label.

Reception
The Allmusic review by Don Snowden awarded the album 3 stars stating "Live at Montmarte isn't all it could have been, but sometimes things just don't happen. It sounds like Scofield and the group never found a truly comfortable common ground. They don't clash, but it never feels like they're totally in synch, either, at least not enough to reach the greater-than-the-sum-of-the-quartet-with-guest-soloist-parts level". The Penguin Guide to Jazz awarded the album 3 stars stating "Scofield's unison statement with George on "Forever Lovers" is one of the highlights... As a live document, it's OK, but still not a proper monument to Adams's larger-than-life personality".

Track listing
All compositions by Don Pullen except where noted.
 "I.J." (John Scofield) - 8:07
 "Flame Games" (George Adams) - 11:30
 "Well, I Guess We'll Never Know" - 8:27
 "Forever Lovers" (Adams) - 10:53
 "Song Everlasting" - 11:23
Recorded at the Jazzhus Montmartre in Copenhagen on April 4 & 5, 1985

Personnel
 Don Pullen – piano
 George Adams – tenor saxophone
 John Scofield - guitar
 Cameron Brown – bass
 Dannie Richmond – drums

References

Timeless Records live albums
Don Pullen live albums
George Adams (musician) live albums
1985 live albums
Albums recorded at Jazzhus Montmartre